Yartsev is a Slavic masculine surname, its feminine counterpart is Yartseva. It may refer to:

Georgi Yartsev (1948–2022), Soviet/Russian football player
Marina Yartseva (born 1989), Russian handball player
Viktoria Yartseva (1906–1999), Soviet/Russian linguist

See also
Volkov-Yartsev VYa-23

Russian-language surnames